William I. Serad (1863 – November 1, 1925), was a professional baseball player who played pitcher in the Major Leagues from -. Serad played for the Cincinnati Red Stockings and Buffalo Bisons.

External links

1863 births
1925 deaths
Major League Baseball pitchers
Baseball players from Philadelphia
Cincinnati Red Stockings (AA) players
Buffalo Bisons (NL) players
19th-century baseball players
Utica Pent Ups players
Syracuse Stars (minor league baseball) players
Toronto Canucks players
Newark Little Giants players
Rockford Hustlers players